Henrik Pedersen (born 10 June 1975) is a retired Danish footballer who played as a striker for Silkeborg IF, Bolton Wanderers and Hull City. He played three games for the Danish national team.

Career

Silkeborg
Born in Kjellerup, Denmark, Pedersen started his career with Danish club Silkeborg IF in 1995. He made his debut for the Danish national team in an August 2000 game against the Faroe Islands. He finished the second highest scoring player of the 2000–01 Superliga season and helped Silkeborg win the 2001 Danish Cup trophy.

Bolton Wanderers
Pedersen signed for Bolton Wanderers on 3 July 2001 for £650,000, both Borussia Dortmund and Stuttgart had expressed interest in taking Pedersen to the Bundesliga that summer as well. He made his debut on 18 August 2001 in Bolton's opening day 5–0 win against Leicester City, coming on as a second-half substitute for Ricardo Gardner. Pedersen scored his first goal for the club on 11 September 2001 in the League Cup second round tie against Walsall, he came on as a second-half substitute for Gareth Farrelly before scoring an extra-time winning goal to seal a 4–3 victory for The Wanderers.

Struggling with his performances in the English Premier League, he went on loan back to Silkeborg IF, to aid their fight against relegation in the last part of the 2001–02 season. He returned to Bolton for the 2002–03 season and became an important part of the Bolton squad. At the start of the 2005–06 season he showed his versatility by playing at left-back in an emergency. He is known for his "peacock" goal celebration, a treat he developed with fellow Danish player Martin Retov.

Hull City
He left Bolton Wanderers in May 2007 and signed for Hull City on 13 August 2007. In an injury-hit season, he mainly played on the left of midfield when fit, and also deputised at left-back.

In July 2008, Pedersen left Hull City, citing family reasons.

Return to Silkeborg
Having left Hull City Pedersen re-signed for his third stint at Silkeborg.

Personal life
In Denmark he is known by his nickname, "Tømrer", which means "Carpenter".

Pedersen is now retired and lives in Silkeborg where he owns the sports pub Målet (English: The Goal).

Honours
2001 Danish Cup

References

External links
Danish national team profile

Bolton Wanderers Interview

1975 births
Living people
Danish men's footballers
Danish expatriate men's footballers
Silkeborg IF players
Danish Superliga players
Premier League players
Bolton Wanderers F.C. players
Hull City A.F.C. players
Expatriate footballers in England
Denmark international footballers
Association football forwards
Association football utility players
People from Kjellerup
Sportspeople from the Central Denmark Region